Tenaturris isiola is an extinct species of sea snail, a marine gastropod mollusk in the family Mangeliidae.

Description
The length of the shell attains 9.1 mm, its diameter 3.9 mm.

Distribution
This extinct marine species can be found in Pliocene strata of the Bowden Formation, Jamaica; age range: 3.6 to 2.588 Ma

References

 W. P. Woodring. 1928. Miocene Molluscs from Bowden, Jamaica. Part 2: Gastropods and discussion of results . Contributions to the Geology and Palaeontology of the West Indies
 A. J. W. Hendy, D. P. Buick, K. V. Bulinski, C. A. Ferguson, and A. I. Miller. 2008. Unpublished census data from Atlantic coastal plain and circum-Caribbean Neogene assemblages and taxonomic opinions

isiola
Gastropods described in 1928